Natalia Dontcheva is a Bulgarian actress who is based in France. She is best known to international audiences for her performances as Madame de Joncquières in Lady J (Mademoiselle de Joncquières), and as Elena in Sashinka.

Born in Sofia, she is the daughter of actor Plamen Donchev.

For Sashinka, she received a Prix Iris nomination for Best Supporting Actress at the 21st Quebec Cinema Awards in 2019.

Filmography

Film
 1987: Voyage dans le temps — Antonia
 1989: Rio Adio (Adieu Rio) — fille de Vera
 1999: Le Voyage à Paris — Natalia
 2003: Mauvais Esprit — La nounou
 2006: Un an — Victoire
 2006: Premonition (Le Pressentiment) — Helena Jozic
 2009: Le Siffleur — La traductrice russe
 2009: A Man and His Dog (Un homme et son chien) — la guichetière SNCF
 2010: Coursier — Iris
 2018: Lady J (Mademoiselle de Joncquières) — Madame de Joncquières
 2018: Sashinka — Elena

References

1969 births
20th-century Bulgarian actresses
21st-century Bulgarian actresses
20th-century French actresses
21st-century French actresses
Actresses from Sofia
Bulgarian film actresses
Bulgarian television actresses
Bulgarian stage actresses
Bulgarian emigrants to France
French film actresses
French television actresses
French stage actresses
Living people